Baard or Bård may refer to:

People with the given name
Baard Iversen (1836–1920), Norwegian businessperson and politician
Baard Madsen Haugland (1835–1896), Norwegian politician
Baard Owe (1936–2017), Norwegian-born actor
Baard Slagsvold (born 1963), Norwegian pop and jazz musician
Bård Eker (born 1961), Norwegian industrial designer and entrepreneur
Bård Jørgen Elden, Norwegian Nordic combined skier 
Bård Nesteng (born 1979), Norwegian archer

People with the surname
Frances Baard (1909–1997), South African (ethnic Tswana) trade unionist
Henricus Petrus Baard (1906–2000), director of the Frans Hals Museum
Justin Baard (born 1993), Namibian cricketer
Stephan Baard (born 1992), Namibian cricketer

Other uses 
Baard, Friesland, a town in the Netherlands
Boston Alliance Against Registration and the Draft (BAARD), anti-draft/anti-registration organization based in Cambridge, United States
Baard language, an endangered Australian Aboriginal language

See also
Bard (disambiguation)